The Kitwanga River is a tributary of the Skeena River near Hazelton in northwestern British Columbia, Canada, joining that stream at the community of Kitwanga (Gitwangak), which means "people of the place of rabbits".

Just north of Kitwancool Lake is a level pass with the upper basin of the Cranberry River, a tributary of the Nass. The Kispiox Range lies west of the valley of the Kitwanga and Cranberry rivers.

See also
List of rivers of British Columbia
Kitwanga Fort National Historic Site
Kitwanga Mountain Provincial Park

References

Rivers of British Columbia
Skeena Country
Cassiar Land District